William Christopher Wordsworth  (1878 – 12 December 1950) was a British academic and journalist in India.

Life
Wordsworth was educated at the University College of Wales, Aberystwyth and Jesus College, Oxford.  In 1905, he was appointed as a lecturer at St John's College, Battersea (a predecessor institution of University College Plymouth St Mark & St John), before joining the Indian Educational Service in 1907.  He was Professor of Political Economy at the Presidency College, Calcutta and then became Assistant Director of Public Instruction for Bengal before returning to the Presidency College as Principal in 1915.  In 1917, he became Director of Public Instruction.  After his retirement, he joined The Statesman, becoming assistant editor and also acting as the Calcutta correspondent for The Times.  He was appointed a Companion of the Order of the Indian Empire. Wordsworth died at Alkham, near Dover, Kent on 12 December 1950, not long after returning to Britain.

References

1878 births
1950 deaths
Alumni of Aberystwyth University
Alumni of Jesus College, Oxford
British male journalists
Academics of Plymouth Marjon University
Companions of the Order of the Indian Empire
Principals of Presidency University, Kolkata
The Times people